Richard A. Anthes (born March 9, 1944) was a long time president of the University Corporation for Atmospheric Research (from 1988 to 2012). The Anthes Building in Boulder, Colorado, is the first UCAR-owned building to be named for an eminent scientist – and a living one at that.” His area of study at the University of Wisconsin, Madison, focused on hurricanes and tropical cyclones. Dr. Anthes taught as a professor for ten years at Pennsylvania State University before accepting a position at the National Center for Atmospheric Research as director of the Atmospheric and Prediction Division in 1981, a position he kept until 1986 when he became director of NCAR. In 1988, he started working as president of UCAR, and retired from that position in 2012. During his presidency at UCAR, he participated or chaired over forty different national committees for agencies such as NASA, NSF, and NOAA. He also established a program aimed at increasing participation (especially of minority professionals) in the atmospheric sciences called SOARS (Significant Opportunities in Atmospheric Research and Science).

Books 

Dr. Anthes has published a number of books:

Anthes, R. A., 1981: Instructor's Manual to Accompany The Atmosphere. 3rd ed. Merrill Publishing Company, Columbus.

Anthes, R. A., 1981: Current Mesoscale Meteorological Research in the United States. National Academies Press, Washington.

Anthes, R. A., J. J. Cahir, A. B. Fraser, and H. A. Panofsky, 1981: The Atmosphere. 3rd ed. Merrill Publishing Company, Columbus.

Anthes, R. A., 1982: Tropical Cyclones: Their Evolution, Structure and Effects. American Meteorological Society, Boston.

Cotton, W. R., and R. A. Anthes, 1992: Storm and Cloud Dynamics. Academic Press, San Diego.

Anthes, R. A., 1996: Meteorology. 7th ed. Macmillan Publishing Company, New York.

Anthes, R. A., 1997: Toward a New National Weather Service: An Assessment of the Advanced Weather Interactive Processing System: Operational Test and Evaluation of the First System Build. National Academies Press, Washington.

Anthes, R. A., M. Garstang, R. Simpson, and J. Simpson, eds., 2003: Hurricane! Coping with disaster: Progress and challenges since Galveston, 1900. American Geophysical Union, Washington.

Anthes, R. A., 2007: Earth Science and Applications From Space: National Imperatives for the Next Decade and Beyond. National Academies Press, Washington.

Awards and honors 
 
In 2003, Dr. Anthes was the winner of China's Friendship Award, which is the highest award presented to foreigners by the People's Republic of China and he was the first atmospheric scientist ever to receive this award. He also received two awards from the American Meteorological Society:  the Clarence L. Meisinger Award in January, 1980, and the Jule G. Charney Award in January 1987.

References

External links 
Richard A. Anthes, UCAR President Emeritus. UCAR.

1944 births
Atmospheric physicists
Living people